Fucaria striata is a species of sea snail, a marine gastropod mollusk in the family Skeneidae.

Distribution
This marine species occurs off hydrothermal vents of the Juan de Fuca Ridge.

References

External links
 To Encyclopedia of Life
 To USNM Invertebrate Zoology Mollusca Collection
 To World Register of Marine Species

striata
Gastropods described in 1993